David Harold "Dry Hole" Byrd (24 April 1900 – 14 September 1986) was a noted Texan producer of petroleum, and a co-founder of the Civil Air Patrol. Byrd's cousin, polar explorer Richard E. Byrd, named Antarctica's Harold Byrd Mountains for him.

Personal background
Byrd was born in Detroit, Texas on April 24, 1900, the youngest of eight children of Mary Easley Byrd and Edward Byrd, and grew up in Texas and Oklahoma. Byrd's cousin, polar explorer Richard E. Byrd, named Antarctica's Harold Byrd Mountains for him, after Byrd had contributed to the expedition that found them. Another cousin (Richard's brother) was Harry F. Byrd, who became a Democratic Party Governor of Virginia and a leading conservative US Senator.

Byrd worked in the Burkburnett, Texas oilfield before attending Trinity University in 1917 and studying geology at the University of Texas in 1919–1921. During the summer vacations he worked at an oilfield in Santa Anna, Texas.

Byrd married twice; on June 8, 1935, he married Mattie Caruth (March 7, 1908 to February 15, 1972) and again on February 14, 1974 - on her birthday - to the widow Mavis Barnett Heath (February 14, 1908 to April 9, 1998) following the death of his first wife in 1972. He had two sons from his first marriage. The two sons were David Harold Byrd Jr. and Caruth Clark Byrd.

Mavis Barnett Heath was the widow of William Womack Heath (December 7, 1903 to June 22, 1971) and this couple were close friends to Lyndon B. Johnson and his wife, Lady Bird Johnson. This Heath couple were instrumental in bringing the LBJ Library to the University of Texas.

On September 14, 1986, David Harold 'Dry Hole' Byrd died while living in the City of Dallas, County of Dallas, Texas, and was buried at the Sparkman Hillcrest Memorial Park in that community which was also the resting place of his 1st wife. (See: findagrave.com)

Oil business career
After graduation, Byrd worked for H.E. Humphreys, and as a geological oil scout for several oil companies including Old Dominion Oil Company of San Antonio before becoming, in 1925, an independent consultant and driller in Brownwood, Texas. Here he acquired his "dry hole" nickname by drilling 56 wells that produced no oil until on 28 May 1928 he drilled two productive wells on the same day, one of them, the Byrd-Daniels Oil Field producing 1000 barrels a day at $3 a barrel.

In 1931 Byrd founded Byrd-Frost Incorporated with Jack Frost, which operated 492 East Texas wells that produced an average of 4,000 barrels a day. In the 1930s he purchased the Texas School Book Depository in Dallas, scene of the 1963 assassination of John F. Kennedy.

Aviation business
During this period Byrd became very interested in aviation. In 1938 he was named to the Texas Civil Aeronautics Commission by Texas Governor James V. Allred, and was involved in founding the Civil Air Patrol (CAP) in September 1941. During World War II Byrd commanded a CAP anti-submarine base at Beaumont, Texas.  After the war Byrd helped incorporate CAP and have it designated as an Auxiliary of the Air Force, helped initiate the International Air Cadet Exchange, and established or supported cadet scholarships. For his work with the CAP Byrd was awarded the US Air Force's Air Force Scroll of Appreciation on 24 May 1963.

LTV
In 1944 Byrd founded Byrd Oil Corporation, which was later sold to Mobil Oil. That year he also founded B.H. Drilling Corporation.  Byrd's Three States Natural Gas Company was sold to Delhi-Taylor Oil Corporation in 1961.

In 1952 Byrd established the Three States Natural Gas Company, which he later sold to Delhi-Taylor, using the money to invest in aircraft production, co-founding Temco Aircraft, 
which in 1961 merged with friend James Ling's electronics company and aircraft manufacturer Chance Vought Corporation to form Ling-Temco-Vought (LTV).

Books
 I'm an Endangered Species: The Autobiography of a Free Enterpriser, Pacesetter Press, 1978,

References

American aerospace businesspeople
American businesspeople in the oil industry
American petroleum geologists
1900 births
1986 deaths
University of Texas at Austin alumni
20th-century American businesspeople
20th-century American geologists